Ben Biri is a Papua New Guinean former professional rugby league footballer who represented Papua New Guinea at the 1995 World Cup.

Playing career
Biri played prop, weighing in at 18 stone. He first represented Papua New Guinea in 1992 before playing in the 1995 World Cup and again in 1996 against the touring Great Britain Lions.

References

Living people
Papua New Guinea national rugby league team players
Papua New Guinean rugby league players
Place of birth missing (living people)
Port Moresby Vipers players
Rugby league props
Year of birth missing (living people)